Anolis beckeri, also known commonly as Becker's anole and Becker's lichen anole, is a species of lizard in the family Dactyloidae. The species is native to Central America and southern North America.

Etymology
The specific name, beckeri, is in honor of Belgian arachnologist Léon Becker.

Geographic range
A. beckeri is found in Belize, Guatemala, Honduras, southeastern Mexico (Campeche, Chiapas, Oaxaca, Quintana Roo, Tabasco, Veracruz), and northern Nicaragua.

Habitat

Description
The tail is relatively short, 1–1.5 times SVL.

Behavior
A. beckeri is arboreal.

Reproduction
A. beckeri is oviparous. Eggs are laid high in trees, in epiphytic bromeliads, and the adult female displays some parental care.

References

Further reading
Boulenger GA (1881). "Description of a new Species of Anolis from Yucatan". Proceedings of the Zoological Society of London 1881: 921–922. (Anolis beckeri, new species).
Boulenger GA (1885). Catalogue of the Lizards in the British Museum (Natural History). Second Edition. Volume II. Iguanidæ .... London: Trustees of the British Museum (Natural History). (Taylor and Francis, printers). xiii + 497 pp. + Plates I–XXIV. (Anolis beckeri, pp. 46–47).
Köhler G (2010). "A revision of the Central American species related to Anolis pentaprion with the resurrection of A. becker and the description of a new species (Squamata: Polycrotidae)". Zootaxa 2354: 1–18.
Owens JB, Carter KC, Chablé CS, Griffin R (2016). "Reproductive and parental care notes for Norops beckeri (Boulanger [sic], 1891) in northern Guatemala". Mesoamerican Herpetology 3 (4): 1007–1010.

Anoles
Reptiles described in 1881
Taxa named by George Albert Boulenger